Anthocephalum healyae is a species of flatworms. It can be differentiated by its overall size, the number of proglottids and marginal loculi, the number and arrangement of its testes, the size of its apical sucker, the arrangement and distribution of vitelline follicles, and the "muscularity" of its genital pore.

References

External links
WORMS

Cestoda
Animals described in 2015